GKS Naprzód Świętochłowice Lipiny is a sports club from Świętochłowice's district of Lipiny (Upper Silesia, Poland), founded in 1920 by Alfons Maniura, who became Naprzód first chairman. Throughout the years, the club for many times changed name. In 1920–1939 and then in 1945–1965 it was Naprzód Lipiny, in 1939–1945 – during German occupation – Turn und Sportverein (TuS) Lipine. In 1965–1969 – Naprzód-Czarni Świętochłowice (after a merge of clubs Naprzód Lipiny and Czarni Chropaczów). Since 1969 to this day – SKS Naprzód Świętoch łowice.

For many years Naprzod was a significant force of Polish soccer, even though the team has never won promotion to the Polish Soccer League. In interwar Poland, Lipiny's side was for many times champion of strong, regional Upper-Silesian league (1929, 1931, 1933, 1937). In the late 1930s, some Naprzod's players were key members of Poland National Team (brothers Ryszard Piec and Wilhelm Piec, as well as Erwin Michalski). Also, Naprzod's own Rochus Nastula was in the late 1920s one of the best scorers of the League (while representing Czarni Lwow). Another famous Naprzod player was Antoni Piechniczek, who represented the team in the 1960s.

During the Second World War, German occupiers changed club's name to Turn und Sportverein (TuS) Lipine. It joined the Gauliga Oberschlesien in 1941, winning the league in 1943–44, its last completed edition. The team, with the Piec brothers, was a sensation in the 1942–43 season of Tschammer Cup (German Cup) games. TuS reached as far as semifinals of the tournament, only then to lose 0–6 to the professionals of TSV 1860 Munich.

After the war, Naprzod in 1949 won promotion to newly created Second Division. It played there in the years 1949–1952 and 1955–1962. Twice Lipiny's side was very close to winning promotion to First Division, however referees and soccer authorities did not like Naprzod and in mysterious circumstances, teams of Arkonia Szczecin and Gwardia Warszawa finished games in front of it. In 1950–51, Naprzod reached the quarter-finals of Polish Cup. Currently, the team plays in Upper Silesian, regional B-class.
 
Naprzod, however, is famous not only for its soccer team, but also boxers (Lipiny's Jerzy Rudzki was for three times boxing champion of Poland – 1931, 1932, 1933) and table-tennis players (team champions of Poland in 1947, 1948 and 1950).

Świętochłowice
Association football clubs established in 1920
Sport in Silesian Voivodeship
Football clubs in Silesian Voivodeship
Football clubs from former German territories